Ainja is a village in Mulgi Parish in Viljandi County in southern Estonia. It borders the villages Mäeküla, Sudiste, Karksi, Kõvaküla and Äriküla as well as Helme Parish.

References

Villages in Viljandi County
Kreis Pernau